The Nicomachean Ethics is Aristotle's best-known work on ethics, the science of the good for human life, which is the goal or end at which all our actions aim. (I§2) The aim of the inquiry is political science and the master art of politics. (I§1) It consists of ten books or scrolls, understood to be based on notes from his lectures at the Lyceum. The title is often assumed to refer to his son Nicomachus, to whom the work was dedicated or who may have edited it (although his young age makes this less likely). Alternatively, the work may have been dedicated to his father, who was also called Nicomachus. The work plays a pre-eminent role in explaining Aristotelian ethics.

The theme of the work is a Socratic question previously explored in the works of Plato, Aristotle's friend and teacher, about how men should best live. In his Metaphysics, Aristotle describes how Socrates, the friend and teacher of Plato, had turned philosophy to human questions, whereas pre-Socratic philosophy had only been theoretical. Ethics, as now separated out for discussion by Aristotle, is practical rather than theoretical, in the original Aristotelian senses of these terms. In other words, it is not only a contemplation about good living, because it also aims to create good living. It is therefore connected to Aristotle's other practical work, Politics, which similarly aims at people becoming good. Ethics is about how individuals should best live, while the study of politics is from the perspective of a law-giver, looking at the good of a whole community.

The Nicomachean Ethics is widely considered one of the most historically important philosophical works and had an important influence on the European Middle Ages, becoming one of the core works of medieval philosophy. Therefore, it indirectly became of great significance in the development of all modern philosophy as well as European law and theology. Many parts of the Nicomachean Ethics are well known in their own right, within different fields. While various philosophers influenced Christendom since its earliest times, in Western Europe, Aristotle became "the Philosopher". In the Middle Ages, a synthesis between Aristotelian ethics and Christian theology became widespread in Europe, as introduced by Albertus Magnus. The most important version of this synthesis was that of Thomas Aquinas. Other more "Averroist" Aristotelians such as Marsilius of Padua were controversial but also influential. (Marsilius is for example sometimes said to have influenced the controversial English political reformer Thomas Cromwell.)

Until well into the seventeenth century, the Nicomachean Ethics was still widely regarded as the main authority for the discipline of ethics at Protestant universities, with over fifty Protestant commentaries published on the Nicomachean Ethics before 1682. During the seventeenth century, however, several authors such as Francis Bacon and Thomas Hobbes argued forcefully and largely successfully that the medieval and Renaissance Aristotelian tradition in practical thinking had become a great impediment to philosophy in their time. In more recent generations, however, Aristotle's original works (if not those of his medieval followers) have once again become an important source. More recent philosophers influenced by this work include Alasdair MacIntyre, G. E. M. Anscombe, Mortimer Adler, Hans-Georg Gadamer, and Martha Nussbaum.

Title and abbreviations

The Nicomachean Ethics is often abbreviated as NE or EN. Books and chapters are referred to with both Roman and Arabic numerals, along with corresponding Bekker numbers. (Thus, "NE II.2, 1103b1" means "Nicomachean Ethics, book II, chapter 2, Bekker page 1103, Bekker column b, line number 1".)

Background
This work is closely related to Aristotle's Eudemian Ethics in that parts overlap. Books V, VI, and VII of the Nicomachean Ethics are identical to Books IV, V, and VI of the Eudemian Ethics. Opinions about the relationship between the two works are divided. It has been suggested that three NE books were lost and subsequently replaced by three parallel works from the Eudemian Ethics, explaining the overlap. Others have proposed that both works were not put into their current form by Aristotle himself, but by an editor sometime later.

There is no consensus on the overall date of composition of the Nicomachean Ethics; however, a reference in the text to a battle in the Third Sacred War datable to 353 BC acts as a terminus post quem for that part of the work. The traditional position, held by W. D. Ross, is that it is a product of the last period of Aristotle's life during his time in Athens from 335 until his death in 322 BC.

Synopsis
The first philosopher to write ethical treatises, Aristotle argues that the correct approach for studying such controversial subjects as Ethics or Politics, which involve discussing what is beautiful or just, is to start with what would be roughly agreed to be true by people of good up-bringing and experience in life, and to work from there to a higher understanding.

Taking this approach, Aristotle begins by saying that the highest good for humans, the highest aim of all human practical thinking, is eudaimonia, a Greek word often translated as flourishing and studied as psychological well-being. Aristotle in turn argues that this is properly understood as an ongoing and stable dynamic, a way of being in action (energeia), specifically appropriate to the human "soul" (psuchē), at its most "excellent" or virtuous (virtue translates aretē in Greek). If there are several virtues, then the best and most complete or perfect of them will be the happiest one. An excellent human will be a person good at living life, who does it well and beautifully. Aristotle says that such a person would also be a serious human being, in the same sense of "serious" that one contrasts serious harpists with other harpists.

From this starting point, Aristotle goes into discussion of what ethics, a term Aristotle helped develop, means. Aristotelian Ethics is about what makes a virtuous character possible, which is in turn necessary if happiness is to be possible. He describes a sequence of necessary steps to achieve this: First, righteous actions, often done under the influence of teachers, allow the development of the right habits. These in turn can allow the development of a good stable character in which the habits are voluntary, and this in turn gives a chance of achieving . Character here translates  in Greek, related to modern words such as ethics, ethical and ethos. Aristotle does not however equate character with habit ( in Greek, with a short "e") because real character involves conscious choice, unlike habit. Instead of being habit, character is a hexis like health or knowledge, meaning it is a stable disposition that must be pursued and maintained with some effort. However, good habits are described as a precondition for good character.

Aristotle then turns to examples, reviewing some of the specific ways that people are thought worthy of blame or praise. As he proceeds, he describes how the highest types of praise, so the highest types of virtue, imply having all the virtues of character at once, and these in turn imply not just good character, but a kind of wisdom. The four virtues that he says require the possession of all the ethical virtues together are:
Being of "great soul" (magnanimity), the virtue where someone would be truly deserving of the highest praise and have a correct attitude towards the honor this may involve. This is the first case mentioned, and it is mentioned within the initial discussion of practical examples of virtues and vices at 1123b Book IV.
The type of justice or fairness of a good ruler in a good community is then given a similar description, during the special discussion of the virtue (or virtues) of justice at 1129b in Book V.
Phronesis or practical judgment as shown by good leaders is the next to be mentioned in this way at 1144b in Book VI.
The virtue of being a truly good friend is the final example at 1157a in Book VIII.

(In the Eudemian Ethics (Book VIII, chapter 3) Aristotle also uses the word "kalokagathia", the nobility of a gentleman, to describe this same concept of a virtue containing all the moral virtues.)

This style of building up a picture wherein it becomes clear that praiseworthy virtues in their highest form, even virtues like courage, seem to require intellectual virtue, is a theme of discussion Aristotle chooses to associate in the Nicomachean Ethics with Socrates, and indeed it is an approach we find portrayed in the Socratic dialogues of Plato. Aristotle also does this himself, and though he professes to work differently from Plato by trying to start with what well-brought up men would agree with, by book VII Aristotle eventually comes to argue that the highest of all human virtues is itself not practical, being contemplative wisdom (theōria 1177a). But achieving this supreme condition is inseparable from achieving all the virtues of character, or "moral virtues".

The way Aristotle sketches the highest good for man as involving both a practical and theoretical side, with the two sides necessary for each other, is also in the tradition of Socrates and Plato—as opposed to pre-Socratic philosophy. As  points out (p. 212): "The Ethics does not end at its apparent peak, identifying perfect happiness with the life devoted to theōria; instead it goes on to introduce the need for a study of legislation, on the grounds that it is not sufficient only to know about virtue, but one should try to put that knowledge to use." At the end of the book, according to Burger, the thoughtful reader is led to understand that "the end we are seeking is what we have been doing" while engaging with the Ethics. (p. 215)

Book I

Book I attempts to both define the subject matter itself and justify the method that has been chosen (in chapters 3, 4, 6 and 7). As part of this, Aristotle considers common opinions along with the opinions of poets and philosophers.

Who should study ethics, and how

Concerning accuracy and whether ethics can be treated in an objective way, Aristotle points out that the "things that are beautiful and just, about which politics investigates, involve great disagreement and inconsistency, so that they are thought to belong only to convention and not to nature". For this reason Aristotle claims it is important not to demand too much precision, like the demonstrations we would demand from a mathematician, but rather to treat the beautiful and the just as "things that are so for the most part." We can do this because people are good judges of what they are acquainted with, but this in turn implies that the young (in age or in character), being inexperienced, are not suitable for study of this type of political subject.

Chapter 6 contains a famous digression in which Aristotle appears to question his "friends" who "introduced the forms". This is understood to be referring to Plato and his school, famous for what is now known as the Theory of Forms. Aristotle says that while both "the truth and one's friends" are loved, "it is a sacred thing to give the highest honor to the truth". The section is yet another explanation of why the Ethics will not start from first principles, which would mean starting out by trying to discuss "The Good" as a universal thing that all things called good have in common. Aristotle says that while all the different things called good do not seem to have the same name by chance, it is perhaps better to "let go for now" because this attempt at precision "would be more at home in another type of philosophic inquiry", and would not seem to be helpful for discussing how particular humans should act, in the same way that doctors do not need to philosophize over the definition of health in order to treat each case. In other words, Aristotle is insisting on the importance of his distinction between theoretical and practical philosophy, and the Nicomachean Ethics is practical.

Defining "Flourishing" (eudaimonia) and the aim of the Ethics
The main stream of discussion starts from the well-known opening of Chapter 1, with the assertion that all technical arts, all investigations (every , including the Ethics itself), indeed all deliberate actions and choice, all aim at some good apart from themselves. Aristotle points to the fact that many aims are really only intermediate aims, and are desired only because they make the achievement of higher aims possible.

In Chapter 2, Aristotle asserts that there is only one highest aim,  (traditionally translated as "happiness"), and it must be the same as the aim politics should have, because what is best for an individual is less beautiful and divine than what is good for a people (ethnos) or city (polis). Politics rules over practical life so the proper aim of politics should include the proper aim of all other pursuits, so that "this end would be the human good". The human good is a practical target, and contrasts with Plato's references to "the Good itself". He concludes what is now known as Chapter 2 of Book 1 by stating that ethics ("our investigation" or ) is "in a certain way political".

Chapter 3 goes on to elaborate on the methodological concern with exactness. Ethics, unlike some other types of philosophy, is inexact and uncertain. Aristotle says that it would be unreasonable to expect strict mathematical style demonstrations, but "each man judges correctly those matters with which he is acquainted".

Chapter 4 states that while most would agree to call the highest aim of humanity (eudaimonia), and also to equate this with both living well and doing things well, there is dispute between people, and between the majority (hoi polloi) and "the wise". Chapter 5 distinguishes three distinct ways of life that different people associate with happiness.
The slavish way of pleasure, which is the way the majority of people think of happiness.
The refined and active way of politics, which aims at honor, (honor itself implying the higher divinity of those who are wise and know and judge, and potentially honor, political people).
The way of contemplation.

Aristotle also mentions two other possibilities that he argues can be put aside:
Having virtue but being inactive, even suffering evils and misfortunes, which Aristotle says no one would consider unless they were defending a hypothesis. (As Sachs points out, this is indeed what Plato depicts Socrates doing in his Gorgias.)
Money making, which Aristotle asserts to be a life based on aiming at what is pursued by necessity in order to achieve higher goals, an intermediate good.

Each of these three commonly proposed happy ways of life represents targets that some people aim at for their own sake, just like they aim at happiness itself for its own sake. Concerning honor, pleasure, and intelligence (nous) and also every virtue, though they lead to happiness, even if they did not we would still pursue them.

Happiness in life, then, includes the virtues, and Aristotle adds that it would include self-sufficiency, not the self-sufficiency of a hermit, but of someone with a family, friends and community. By itself this would make life choiceworthy and lacking nothing. To describe more clearly what happiness is like, Aristotle next asks what the work of a human is. All living things have nutrition and growth as a work, all animals (according to the definition of animal Aristotle used) would have perceiving as part of their work, but what is more particularly human? The answer according to Aristotle is that it must involve reason (logos), including both being open to persuasion by reasoning, and thinking things through. Not only will human happiness involve reason, but it will also be an active being-at-work (energeia), not just potential happiness. And it will be over a lifetime, because "one swallow does not make a spring". The definition given is therefore:

And because happiness is being described as a work or function of humans, we can say that just as we contrast harpists with serious harpists, the person who lives well and beautifully in this actively rational and virtuous way will be a "serious" human.

As an example of popular opinions about happiness, Aristotle cites an "ancient one and agreed to by the philosophers". According to this opinion, which he says is right, the good things associated with the soul are most governing and especially good, when compared to the good things of the body, or good external things. Aristotle says that virtue, practical judgment and wisdom, and also pleasure, all associated with happiness, and indeed an association with external abundance, are all consistent with this definition.

If happiness is virtue, or a certain virtue, then it must not just be a condition of being virtuous, potentially, but an actual way of virtuously "being at work" as a human. For as in the Ancient Olympic Games, "it is not the most beautiful or the strongest who are crowned, but those who compete". And such virtue will be good, beautiful and pleasant, indeed Aristotle asserts that in most people different pleasures are in conflict with each other while "the things that are pleasant to those who are passionately devoted to what is beautiful are the things that are pleasant by nature and of this sort are actions in accordance with virtue". External goods are also necessary in such a virtuous life, because a person who lacks things such as good family and friends might find it difficult to be happy.

Questions that might be raised about the definition
In chapters 9-12, Aristotle addresses some objections or questions that might be raised against his definition of happiness thus far.
First, he considers the definition of happiness in contrast to an old Socratic question (found for example in Plato's Meno) of whether happiness might be a result of learning or habit or training, or perhaps divine lot or even chance. Aristotle says that it admits of being shared by some sort of learning and taking pains. But despite this, even if not divine, it is one of the most divine things, and "for what is greatest and most beautiful to be left to chance would be too discordant".

Aristotle justifies that happiness must be considered over a whole lifetime as otherwise Priam, for example, would be defined as unhappy only because of his unhappy old age.
Concerning the importance of chance to happiness, Aristotle argues that a happy person at work in accordance with virtue "will bear what misfortune brings most beautifully and in complete harmony in every instance". Only many great misfortunes will limit how blessed such a life can be, but "even in these circumstances something beautiful shines through".
Addressing an opinion that he expected amongst his contemporaries about happiness, Aristotle says that it "seems too unfeeling and contrary to people's opinions" to claim that "the fortunes of one's descendants and all one's friends have no influence at all". But he says that it seems that if anything at all gets through to the deceased, whether good or the reverse, it would be something faint and small.
Once again, turning to the divinity of happiness, Aristotle distinguishes virtue and happiness saying that virtue, through which people "become apt at performing beautiful actions" is praiseworthy, while happiness is something more important, like god, "since every one of us does everything else for the sake of this, and we set down the source and cause of good things as something honored and divine".

From defining happiness to discussion of virtue: introduction to the rest of the Ethics
Aristotle asserts that we can usefully accept some things said about the soul (clearly a cross-reference to Plato again), including the division of the soul into rational and irrational parts, and the further division of the irrational parts into two parts also:
One irrational part of the human soul is "not human" but "vegetative" and at most work during sleep, when virtue is least obvious.
A second irrational part of the human soul is however able to share in reason in some way. We see this because we know there is something "desiring and generally appetitive" in the soul that can, on different occasions in different people, either oppose reason, or obey it—thus being rational just as we would be rational when we listen to a father being rational.

The virtues then are similarly divided, into intellectual virtues, and the virtues of character (ethical or moral virtues) pertaining to the irrational part of the soul, which can take part in reason.

These virtues of character, or "moral virtues" as they are often translated, become the central topic in Book II.

Books II–V: Concerning excellence of character or moral virtue

Book II: That virtues of character can be described as means
Aristotle says that whereas virtue of thinking needs teaching, experience, and time, virtue of character (moral virtue) comes about as a consequence of following the right habits. According to Aristotle, the potential for this virtue is by nature in humans, but whether virtues come to be present or not is not determined by human nature.

Trying to follow the method of starting with approximate things gentlemen can agree on, and looking at all circumstances, Aristotle says that we can describe virtues as things that are destroyed by deficiency or excess. Someone who runs away becomes a coward, while someone who fears nothing is rash. In this way, the virtue "bravery" can be seen as depending upon a "mean" between two extremes. (For this reason, Aristotle is sometimes considered a proponent of a doctrine of a golden mean.) People become habituated well by first performing actions that are virtuous, possibly because of the guidance of teachers or experience, and in turn these habitual actions then become real virtue where we choose good actions deliberately.

According to Aristotle, character properly understood (i.e. one's virtue or vice), is not just any tendency or habit but something that affects when we feel pleasure or pain. A virtuous person feels pleasure when they perform the most beautiful or noble actions. A person who is not virtuous will often find his or her perceptions of what is most pleasant to be misleading. For this reason, any concern with virtue or politics requires consideration of pleasure and pain. When a person does virtuous actions, for example by chance, or under advice, they are not yet necessarily a virtuous person. It is not like in the productive arts, where the thing being made is what is judged as well made or not. To truly be a virtuous person, one's virtuous actions must meet three conditions: (a) they are done knowingly, (b) they are chosen for their own sakes, and (c) they are chosen according to a stable disposition (not at a whim, or in any way that the acting person might easily change his choice about). And just knowing what would be virtuous is not enough. According to Aristotle's analysis, three kinds of things come to be present in the soul that virtue is: a feeling, an inborn predisposition or capacity (dunamis), or a stable disposition that has been acquired (hexis).

Comparing virtue to productive arts as with arts, virtue of character must not only be the making of a good human, but also the way humans do their own work well. Being skilled in an art can also be described as a mean between excess and deficiency: when they are well done we say that we would not want to take away or add anything from them. But Aristotle points to a simplification in this idea of hitting a mean. In terms of what is best, we aim at an extreme, not a mean, and in terms of what is base, the opposite.

Chapter 7 turns from general comments to specifics. Aristotle gives a list of character virtues and vices that he later discusses in Books II and III. As Sachs points out, (2002, p. 30) it appears the list is not especially fixed, because it differs between the Nicomachean and Eudemian Ethics, and also because Aristotle repeats several times that this is a rough outline.

Aristotle also mentions some "mean conditions" involving feelings: a sense of shame is sometimes praised, or said to be in excess or deficiency. Righteous indignation is a sort of mean between joy at the misfortunes of others and envy. Aristotle says that such cases will need to be discussed later, before the discussion of Justice in Book V, which will also require special discussion. But the Nicomachean Ethics only discusses the sense of shame at that point, and not righteous indignation (which is however discussed in the Eudemian Ethics Book VIII).

In practice Aristotle explains that people tend more by nature towards pleasures, and therefore see virtues as being relatively closer to the less obviously pleasant extremes. While every case can be different, given the difficulty of getting the mean perfectly right it is indeed often most important to guard against going the pleasant and easy way. However this rule of thumb is shown in later parts of the Ethics to apply mainly to some bodily pleasures, and is shown to be wrong as an accurate general rule in Book X.

Book III. Chapters 1–5: Moral virtue as conscious choice
Chapter 1 distinguishes actions chosen as relevant to virtue, and whether actions are to be blamed, forgiven, or even pitied.

Aristotle divides actions into three categories instead of two:
Voluntary acts.
Involuntary or unwilling acts, which is the simplest case where people do not praise or blame. In such cases a person does not choose the wrong thing, for example if the wind carries a person off, or if a person has a wrong understanding of the particular facts of a situation. Note that ignorance of what aims are good and bad, such as people of bad character always have, is not something people typically excuse as ignorance in this sense. "Acting on account of ignorance seems different from acting while being ignorant".
"Non-voluntary" or "non willing" actions that are bad actions done by choice, or more generally (as in the case of animals and children when desire or spirit causes an action) whenever "the source of the moving of the parts that are instrumental in such actions is in oneself" and anything "up to oneself either to do or not". However, these actions are not taken because they are preferred in their own right, but rather because all options available are worse.

It is concerning this third class of actions that there is doubt about whether they should be praised or blamed or condoned in different cases.

Several more critical terms are defined and discussed:
Deliberate choice, "seems to determine one's character more than one's actions do". Things done on the spur of the moment, and things done by animals and children can be willing, but driven by desire and spirit and not what we would normally call true choice. Choice is rational, and according to the understanding of Aristotle, choice can be in opposition to desire. Choice is also not wishing for things one does not believe can be achieved, such as immortality, but rather always concerning realistic aims. Choice is also not simply to do with opinion, because our choices make us the type of person we are, and are not simply true or false. What distinguishes choice is that before a choice is made there is a rational deliberation or thinking things through.
Deliberation, at least for sane people, does not include theoretical contemplation about universal and everlasting things, nor about things that might be far away, nor about things we can know precisely, such as letters. "We deliberate about things that are up to us and are matters of action" and concerning things where it is unclear how they will turn out. Deliberation is therefore not how we reason about ends we pursue, health for example, but how we think through the ways we can try to achieve them. Choice then is decided by both desire and deliberation.
Wishing is not deliberation. We cannot say that what people wish for is good by definition, and although we could say that what is wished for is always what appears good, this will still be very variable. Most importantly we could say that a worthy man will wish for what is "truly" good. Most people are misled by pleasure, "for it seems to them to be a good, though it is not".

Chapter 5 considers choice, willingness and deliberation in cases that exemplify not only virtue, but vice. Virtue and vice according to Aristotle are "up to us". This means that although no one is willingly unhappy, vice by definition always involves actions decided on willingly. (As discussed earlier, vice comes from bad habits and aiming at the wrong things, not deliberately aiming to be unhappy.) Lawmakers also work in this way, trying to encourage and discourage the right voluntary actions, but don't concern themselves with involuntary actions. They also tend not to be lenient to people for anything they could have chosen to avoid, such as being drunk, or being ignorant of things easy to know, or even of having allowed themselves to develop bad habits and a bad character. Concerning this point, Aristotle asserts that even though people with a bad character may be ignorant and even seem unable to choose the right things, this condition stems from decisions that were originally voluntary, the same as poor health can develop from past choices—and, "While no one blames those who are ill-formed by nature, people do censure those who are that way through lack of exercise and neglect."

The vices then, are voluntary just as the virtues are. He states that people would have to be unconscious not to realize the importance of allowing themselves to live badly, and he dismisses any idea that different people have different innate visions of what is good.

Book III. Chapters 6–12, First examples of moral virtues
Aristotle now deals separately with some of the specific character virtues, in a form similar to the listing at the end of Book II, starting with courage and temperance.

Courage

Courage means holding a mean position in one's feelings of confidence and fear. For Aristotle, a courageous person must feel fear. Courage, however, is not thought to relate to fear of evil things it is right to fear, like disgrace—and courage is not the word for a man who does not fear danger to his wife and children, or punishment for breaking the law. Instead, courage usually refers to confidence and fear concerning the most fearful thing, death, and specifically the most potentially beautiful form of death, death in battle. In Book III, Aristotle stated that feeling fear for one's death is particularly pronounced when one has lived a life that is both happy and virtuous, hence, life for this agent is worth living.

The courageous man, says Aristotle, sometimes fears even terrors that not everyone feels the need to fear, but he endures fears and feels confident in a rational way, for the sake of what is beautiful—because this is what virtue aims at. This is described beautiful because the sophia or wisdom in the courageous person makes the virtue of courage valuable. Beautiful action comes from a beautiful character and aims at beauty. The vices opposed to courage were discussed at the end of Book II. Although there is no special name for it, people who have excessive fearlessness would be mad, which Aristotle remarks that some describe Celts as being in his time. Aristotle also remarks that "rash" people, those with excessive confidence, are generally cowards putting on a brave face.

Apart from the correct usage above, the word courage is applied to five other types of character according to Aristotle:

The courage of citizen soldiers. Aristotle says this is largely a result of penalties imposed by laws for cowardice and honors for bravery, but that it is the closest type of seeming courage to real courage, is very important for making an army fight as if brave, but it is different from true courage because not based on voluntary actions aimed at being beautiful in their own right. Aristotle perhaps surprisingly notes that the Homeric heroes such as Hector had this type of courage.
People experienced in some particular danger often seem courageous. This is something that might be seen amongst professional soldiers, who do not panic at false alarms. In another perhaps surprising remark Aristotle specifically notes that such men might be better in a war than even truly courageous people. However, he also notes that when the odds change such soldiers run.
Spirit or anger often looks like courage. Such people can be blind to the dangers they run into though, meaning even animals can be brave in this way, and unlike truly courageous people they are not aiming at beautiful acts. This type of bravery is the same as that of a mule risking punishment to keep grazing, or an adulterer taking risks. Aristotle however notes that this type of spirit shows an affinity to true courage and combined with deliberate choice and purpose it seems to be true courage.
The boldness of someone who feels confident based on many past victories is not true courage. Like a person who is overconfident when drunk, this apparent courage is based on a lack of fear, and will disappear if circumstances change. A truly courageous person is not certain of victory and does endure fear.
Similarly, there are people who are overconfident simply due to ignorance. An overconfident person might stand a while when things do not turn out as expected, but a person confident out of ignorance is likely to run at the first signs of such things.

Chapter 9. As discussed in Book II already, courage might be described as achieving a mean in confidence and fear, but these means are not normally in the middle between the two extremes. Avoiding fear is more important in aiming at courage than avoiding overconfidence. As in the examples above, overconfident people are likely to be called courageous, or considered close to courageous. Aristotle said in Book II that—with the moral virtues such as courage—the extreme one's normal desires tend away from are the most important to aim towards.

When it comes to courage, it heads people towards pain in some circumstances, and therefore away from what they would otherwise desire. Men are sometimes even called courageous just for enduring pain. There can be a pleasant end of courageous actions but it is obscured by the circumstances. Death is, by definition, always a possibility—so this is one example of a virtue that does not bring a pleasant result.

Aristotle's treatment of the subject is often compared to Plato's. Courage was dealt with by Plato in his Socratic dialogue named the Laches.

Temperance

Temperance (Sophrosyne, also translated as soundness of mind, moderation, discretion) is a mean with regards to pleasure. He adds that it is only concerned with pains in a lesser and different way. The vice that occurs most often in the same situations is excess with regards to pleasure (translated licentiousness, intemperance, profligacy, dissipation etc.). Pleasures can be divided into those of the soul and of the body. But those who are concerned with pleasures of the soul, honor, learning, for example, or even excessive pleasure in talking, are not usually referred to as the objects of being temperate or dissipate. Also, not all bodily pleasures are relevant, for example delighting in sights or sounds or smells are not things we are temperate or profligate about, unless it is the smell of food or perfume that triggers another yearning. Temperance and dissipation concern the animal-like, Aphrodisiac, pleasures of touch and taste, and indeed especially a certain type of touch, because dissipated people do not delight in refined distinguishing of flavors, and nor indeed do they delight in feelings one gets during a workout or massage in a gymnasium.

Chapter 11. Some desires like that of food and drink, and indeed sex, are shared by everyone in a certain way. But not everyone has the same particular manifestations of these desires. In the "natural desires" says Aristotle, few people go wrong, and then normally in one direction, towards too much. What is just to fulfill one's need, whereas people err by either desiring beyond this need, or else desiring what they ought not desire. But regarding pains, temperance is different from courage. A temperate person does not need to endure pains, but rather the intemperate person feels pain even with his pleasures, but also by his excess longing.

The opposite is rare, and therefore there is no special name for a person insensitive to pleasures and delight. The temperate person desires the things that are not impediments to health, nor contrary to what is beautiful, nor beyond that person's resources. Such a person judges according to right reason.

Chapter 12. Intemperance is a more willingly chosen vice than cowardice, because it positively seeks pleasure, while cowardice avoids pain, and pain can derange a person's choice. So we reproach intemperance more, because it is easier to habituate oneself so as to avoid this problem. Just as a child needs to live by instructions, the desiring part of the human soul must be in harmony with the rational part. Desire without understanding can become insatiable, and can even impair reason.

Plato's treatment of the same subject is once again frequently compared to Aristotle's, as was apparently Aristotle's intention (see Book I, as explained above):

Book IV. The second set of examples of moral virtues
The set of moral virtues discussed here involves getting the balance of one's behavior right in social or political situations, leading to themes that become critical to the development of some of the most important themes.

Book IV is sometimes described as being very bound to the norms of an Athenian gentleman in Aristotle's time. While this is consistent with the approach Aristotle said he would take in Book I, in contrast to the approach of Plato, there is long running disagreement concerning whether this immersion within the viewpoint of his probable intended readership is just a starting point to build up to more general conclusions, for example in Book VI, or else shows that Aristotle failed to successfully generalize, and that his ethical thinking was truly based upon the beliefs of a Greek gentleman of his time.

Liberality or generosity

This is a virtue we observe when we see how people act with regards to giving money, and things whose worth is thought of in terms of money. The two un-virtuous extremes are wastefulness and stinginess (or meanness). Stinginess is most obviously taking money too seriously, but wastefulness, less strictly speaking, is not always the opposite (an under estimation of the importance of money) because it is also often caused by being unrestrained. A wasteful person is destroyed by their own acts, and has many vices at once. Aristotle's approach to defining the correct balance is to treat money like any other useful thing, and say that the virtue is to know how to use money: giving to the right people, the right amount at the right time. Also, as with each of the ethical virtues, Aristotle emphasizes that such a person gets pleasures and pains at doing the virtuous and beautiful thing. Aristotle goes slightly out of his way to emphasize that generosity is not a virtue associated with making money, because, he points out, a virtuous person is normally someone who causes beautiful things, rather than just being a recipient. Aristotle also points out that we do not give much gratitude and praise at all to someone simply for not taking (which might however earn praise for being just). Aristotle also points out that "generous people are loved practically the most of those who are recognized for virtue, since they confer benefits, and this consists in giving" and he does not deny that generous people often won't be good at maintaining their wealth, and are often easy to cheat. Aristotle goes further in this direction by saying that it might seem that it is better to be wasteful than to be stingy: a wasteful person is cured by age, and by running out of resources, and if they are not merely unrestrained people then they are foolish rather than vicious and badly brought-up. Also, a wasteful person at least benefits someone. Aristotle points out also that a person with this virtue would not get money from someone he should not get it, in order to give "for a decent sort of taking goes along with a decent sort of giving." Having said this however, most people we call wasteful are not only wasteful in the sense opposed to being generous, but also actually unrestrained and have many vices at once. Such people are actually often wasteful and stingy at the same time, and when trying to be generous they often take from sources whence they should not (for example pimps, loan sharks, gamblers, thieves), and they give to the wrong people. Such people can be helped by guidance, unlike stingy people, and most people are somewhat stingy. In fact, ends Aristotle, stinginess is reasonably called the opposite of generosity, "both because it is a greater evil than wastefulness, and because people go wrong more often with it than from the sort of wastefulness described".

Magnificence

Magnificence is described as a virtue similar to generosity except that it deals with spending large amounts of wealth. Aristotle says that while "the magnificent man is liberal, the liberal man is not necessarily magnificent". The immoderate vices in this case would be concerning "making a great display on the wrong occasions and in the wrong way". The extremes to be avoided in order to achieve this virtue are paltriness (Rackham) or chintziness (Sachs) on the one hand and tastelessness or vulgarity on the other. Aristotle reminds us here that he has already said that moral dispositions (hexeis) are caused by the activities (energeia) we perform, meaning that a magnificent person's virtue can be seen from the way he chooses the correct magnificent acts at the right times. The aim of magnificence, like any virtue, is beautiful action, not for the magnificent man himself but on public things, such that even his private gifts have some resemblance to votive offerings. Because he is aiming at a spectacle, a person with this virtue will not be focusing on doing things cheaply, which would be petty, and he or she may well overspend. So as with liberality, Aristotle sees a potential conflict between some virtues, and being good with money. But he does say that magnificence requires spending according to means, at least in the sense that poor men can not be magnificent. The vices of paltriness and vulgar chintziness "do not bring serious discredit, since they are not injurious to others, nor are they excessively unseemly".

Magnanimity or "greatness of soul"

Book IV, Chapter 3. Although the word magnanimity has a traditional connection to Aristotelian philosophy, it also has its own tradition in English, which now causes some confusion. This is why some modern translations refer literally to greatness of soul. In particular, the term implied not just greatness, but a person who thought of themselves worthy of great things, or in other words a sort of pride. (Michael Davis translates it as pride.) Although the term could imply a negative insinuation of lofty pride, Aristotle as usual tries to define what the word should mean as a virtue. He says that "not everybody who claims more than he deserves is vain" and indeed "most small-souled of all would seem to be the man who claims less than he deserves when his deserts are great". Being vain, or being small-souled, are the two extremes that fail to achieve the mean of the virtue of magnanimity. The small souled person, according to Aristotle, "seems to have something bad about him".

To have the virtue of greatness of soul, and be worthy of what is greatest, one must be good in a true sense, and possess what is great in all virtues. As Sachs points out: "Greatness of soul is the first of four virtues that Aristotle will find to require the presence of all the virtues of character." The others are a type of justice (1129b in Book V),  or practical judgment as shown by good leaders (1144b in Book VI), and truly good friends (1157a in Book VIII). Aristotle views magnanimity as "a sort of adornment of the moral virtues; for it makes them greater, and it does not arise without them."

Aristotle also focuses on the question of what the greatest things one may be worthy of. At first he says this is spoken of in terms of external goods, but he observes that the greatest of these must be honor, because this is what we assign to gods, and this is what people of the highest standing aim at. But he qualifies this by saying that actually great souled people will hold themselves moderately toward every type of good or bad fortune, even honor. It is being good, and being worthy of honor that is more important. (The disdain of a great souled person towards all kinds of non-human good things can make great souled people seem arrogant, like an un-deserving vain person.)
Leo Strauss argues that "there is a close kinship between Aristotle's justice and biblical justice, but Aristotle's magnanimity, which means a man's habitual claiming for himself great honors while he deserves these honors, is alien to the Bible". Strauss describes the Bible as rejecting the concept of a gentleman, and that this displays a different approach to the problem of divine law in Greek and Biblical civilization. See also below concerning the sense of shame.

Aristotle lists some typical characteristics of great souled people:
They do not take small risks, and are not devoted to risk taking, but they will take big risks, without regard for their life, because a worse life is worth less than a great life. Indeed, they do few things, and are slow to start on things, unless there is great honor involved.
They do not esteem what is popularly esteemed, nor what others are good at. They take few things seriously, and are not anxious.
They gladly do favors but are ashamed to receive them, being apt to forget a favor from another, or to do a greater one in return. They are pleased to hear discussion about the favors they have done for others, but not about favors done for them.
They are apt to act more high-handedly to a person of high station than a person of middle or low standing, which would be below them.
They are frank in expressing opinions and open about what they hate and love. Not to be so would be due to fear, or the esteem one has of other's opinions over your own.
They lead life as they choose and not as suits others, which would be slave-like.
They are not given to wonder, for nothing seems great to them.
Because they expect others to be lesser, and are not overly concerned with their praise, they are not apt to bear grudges, they are not apt to gossip, and they are not even interested in speaking ill of enemies, except to insult them.
They are not apt to complain about necessities or small matters, nor to ask for help, not wanting to imply that such things are important to them.
They tend to possess beautiful and useless things, rather than productive ones.
They tend to move slowly and speak with a deep steady voice, rather than being hasty or shrill, which would be due to anxiety.

A balanced ambitiousness concerning smaller honors

Book IV, Chapter 4. In parallel with the distinction of scale already made between normal generosity and magnificence, Aristotle proposes that there are two types of virtue associated with honors, one concerned with great honors, Magnanimity or "greatness of soul" and one with more normal honors. This latter virtue is a kind of correct respect for honor, which Aristotle had no Greek word for, but which he said is between being ambitious ( honor-loving) and unambitious ( not honor-loving) with respect to honor. It could include a noble and manly person with appropriate ambition, or a less ambitious person who is moderate and temperate. (In other words, Aristotle makes it clear that he does not think being more  than average is necessarily inappropriate.) To have the correct balance in this virtue means pursuing the right types of honor from the right types of source of honor. In contrast, the ambitious man would get this balance wrong by seeking excess honor from the inappropriate sources, and the unambitious man would not desire appropriately to be honored for noble reasons.

Gentleness concerning anger

Book IV Chapter 5. In contrast, an excessive tendency or vice concerning anger would be irascibility or quickness to anger. Such a person would be unfair in responses, angry at wrong people, and so on. The deficient vice would be found in people who won't defend themselves. They would lack spirit, and be considered foolish and servile. Aristotle does not deny anger a place in the behavior of a good person, but says it should be "on the right grounds and against the right persons, and also in the right manner and at the right moment and for the right length of time". People can get this wrong in numerous ways, and Aristotle says it is not easy to get right. So in this case as with several others several distinct types of excessive vice possible. One of the worst types amongst these is the type that remains angry for too long.

According to Aristotle, the virtue with regards to anger would not be led by the emotions, but by reason. So according to Aristotle, anger can be virtuous and rational in the right circumstances, and he even says that a small amount of excess is not something worth blaming either, and might even be praised as manly and fit for command. The person with this virtue will however tend to err on the side of forgiveness rather than anger, and the person with a deficiency in this virtue, despite seeming foolish and servile, will be closer to the virtue than someone who gets angry too easily.

Something like friendship, between being obsequious and surly

Book IV Chapter 6. These characteristics concern the attitude people have towards whether they cause pain to others. The obsequious person is over-concerned with the pain they cause others, backing down too easily, even when it is dishonorable or harmful to do so, while a surly or quarrelsome person objects to everything and does not care what pain they cause others, never compromising. Once again Aristotle says he has no specific Greek word to give to the correct virtuous mean that avoids the vices, but says it resembles friendship (philia). The difference is that this friendly virtue concerns behavior towards friends and strangers alike, and does not involve the special emotional bond that friends have. Concerning true friendship see books VIII and IX.

According to Aristotle, getting this virtue right also involves:
 Dealing differently with different types of people, for example people in a higher position than oneself, people more or less familiar to you, and so on.
 Sometimes being able to share in the pleasure of one's companions at some expense to oneself, if this pleasure not be harmful or dishonorable.
 Being willing to experience pain in the short term for longer run pleasure of a greater scale.

Apart from the vice of obsequiousness, there is also flattery, which is the third vice whereby someone acts in an obsequious way to try to gain some advantage to themselves.

Honesty about oneself: the virtue between boasting and self-deprecation

Book IV Chapter 7. In translations such as Rackham's the vice at issue here is sometimes referred to in English as boastfulness (Greek ) and this is contrasted to a virtue concerning truthfulness. The reason is that Aristotle describes two kinds of untruthful pretense vices—one that exaggerates things, boastfulness, and one that under-states things. Aristotle points out that this is a very specific realm of honesty, that which concerns oneself. Other types of dishonesty could involve other virtues and vices, such as justice and injustice.

This is a similar subject to the last one discussed concerning surliness and obsequiousness, in that it concerns how to interact socially in a community. In that discussion, the question was how much to compromise with others if it would be painful, harmful or dishonorable. Now the discussion turns to how frank one should be concerning one's own qualities. And just as in the previous case concerning flattery, vices that go too far or not far enough might be part of one's character, or they might be performed as if they were in character, with some ulterior motive. Such dishonesty could involve vices of dishonesty other than boastfulness or self-deprecation of course, but the lover of truth, who is truthful even when nothing depends on it, will be praised and expected to avoid being dishonest when it is most disgraceful.

Aristotle said that he had no convenient Greek word to give to the virtuous and honest mean in this case, but a person who boasts claims qualities inappropriately, while a person who self-deprecates excessively makes no claim to qualities they have, or even disparages himself. Aristotle therefore names the virtuous man as a person who claims the good qualities he has without exaggeration or understatement. As in many of these examples, Aristotle says the excess (boastfulness) is more blameworthy than the deficiency (being self-disparaging).

Unlike the treatment of flattery, described simply as a vice, Aristotle describes ways in which a person might be relatively blameless if they were occasionally dishonest about their own qualities, as long as this does not become a fixed disposition to boast. Specifically, according to Aristotle boasting would not be very much blamed if the aim is honor or glory, but it would be blameworthy if the aim is money.

Parts of this section are remarkable because of the implications for the practice of philosophy. At one point Aristotle says that examples of areas where dishonest boasting for gain might go undetected, and be very blameworthy, would be prophecy, philosophy, or medicine, all of which have both pretense and bragging. This appears to be a criticism of contemporary sophists. But even more remarkable is the fact that one of the vices under discussion, self-deprecation (Greek  from which modern English "irony") is an adjective that was and is often used to describe Socrates. Aristotle even specifically mentions Socrates as an example, but at the same time mentions (continuing the theme) that the less excessive vice is often less blameworthy.

Being witty or charming

Book IV Chapter 8. The subject matter of this discussion is a virtue of being witty, charming and tactful, and generally saying the right things when speaking playfully, at our leisure, which Aristotle says is a necessary part of life. In contrast a buffoon can never resist making any joke, and the deficient vice in this case is an uncultivated person who does not get jokes, and is useless in playful conversation. It is hard to set fixed rules about what is funny and what is appropriate, so a person with this virtue will tend to be like a lawmaker making suitable laws for themselves.

Sense of shame (not a virtue)
Chapter 9. The sense of shame is not a virtue, but more like a feeling than a stable character trait (hexis). It is a fear, and it is only fitting in the young, who live by feeling, but are held back by the feeling of shame. We would not praise older people for such a sense of shame according to Aristotle, since shame should concern acts done voluntarily, and a decent person would not voluntarily do something shameful. Aristotle mentions here that self-restraint is also not a virtue, but refers us to a later part of the book (Book VII) for discussion of this.

Leo Strauss notes that this approach, as well as Aristotle's discussion of magnanimity (above), are in contrast to the approach of the Bible.

Book V: Justice and fairness: a moral virtue needing special discussion
Book V is the same as Book IV of the Eudemian Ethics, the first of three books common to both works. It represents the special discussion on justice already foreseen in earlier books, which covers some of the same material as Plato's Republic, though in a strikingly different way.

 points out that although the chapter nominally follows the same path as previous chapters "it is far from obvious how justice is to be understood as a disposition in relation to a passion: the proposed candidate, greed, would seem to refer, rather, to the vice of injustice and the single opposite of the virtue." In other words, it is not described as a mean between two extremes. Indeed, as Burger points out, the approach is also quite different from previous chapters in the way it categorizes in terms of general principles, rather than building up from commonly accepted opinions.

As Aristotle points out, his approach is partly because people mean so many different things when they use the word justice. The primary division he observes in what kind of person would be called just is that, on the one hand, it could mean "law abiding" or lawful, and on the other, it could mean equitable or fair. Aristotle points out that, "Whatever is unfair is lawless, but not everything lawless is unfair," and, "It would seem that to be a good man is not in every case the same thing as to be a good citizen." These two common meanings of justice coincide, to the extent that any set of laws is itself good, something only lawmakers can affect, and this all-encompassing meaning equates to the justice of a good lawmaker, which becomes Aristotle's point of reference for further discussion. Justice in such a simple and complete and effective sense would according to Aristotle be the same as having a complete ethical virtue, a perfection of character, because this would be someone who is not just virtuous, but also willing and able to put virtue to use amongst their friends and in their community. According to Aristotle, "there are many who can practise virtue in their own private affairs but cannot do so in their relations with another".

Aristotle, however, says that—apart from the complete virtue that would encompass not only all types of justice, but all types of excellence of character—there is a partial virtue that gets called justice, which is clearly distinct from other character flaws. Cowardice for example, might specifically cause a soldier to throw away his shield and run. However, not everyone who runs from a battle does so from cowardice. Often, Aristotle observes, these acts are caused by over-reaching or greed (pleonexia) and are ascribed to injustice. Unlike the virtues discussed so far, an unjust person does not necessarily desire what is bad for himself or herself as an individual, nor does he or she even necessarily desire too much of things, if too much would be bad for him or her. Such "particular injustice" is always greed aimed at particular good things such as honor or money or security.

To understand how justice aims at what is good, it is necessary to look beyond particular good or bad things we might want or not want a share of as individuals, and this includes considering the viewpoint of a community (the subject of Aristotle's Politics). Alone of the virtues, says Aristotle, justice looks like "someone else's good", an argument also confronted by Plato in his Republic.

Particular justice is however the subject of this book, and it has already been divided into the lawful and the fair, which are two different aspects of universal justice or complete virtue. Concerning areas where being law-abiding might not be the same as being fair, Aristotle says that this should be discussed under the heading of Politics. He then divides particular justice further into two parts: distribution of divisible goods and rectification in private transactions. The first part relates to members of a community in which it is possible for one person to have more or less of a good than another person. The second part of particular justice deals with rectification in transactions and this part is itself divided into two parts: voluntary and involuntary, and the involuntary are divided further into furtive and violent divisions. The following chart showing divisions with Aristotle's discussion of Justice in Book V, based on  Appendix 3.

In trying to describe justice as a mean, as with the other ethical virtues, Aristotle says that justice involves "at least four terms, namely, two persons for whom it is just and two shares which are just."(1131a) The just must fall between what is too much and what is too little and the just requires the distribution to be made between people of equal stature.

But in many cases, how to judge what is a mean is not clear, because as Aristotle points out, "if the persons are not equal, they will not have equal shares; it is when equals possess or are allotted unequal shares, or persons not equal equal shares, that quarrels and complaints arise." (1131a23-24). What is just in distribution must also take into account some sort of worth. The parties involved will be different concerning what they deserve, and the importance of this is a key difference between distributive justice and rectificatory justice because distribution can only take place among equals. Aristotle does not state how to decide who deserves more, implying that this depends on the principles accepted in each type of community, but rather he states it is some sort of proportion in which the just is an intermediate between all four elements (2 for the goods and 2 for the people). A final point that Aristotle makes in his discussion of distributive justice is that when two evils must be distributed, the lesser of the evils is the more choice worthy and as such is the greater good (1131b21-25).

The second part of particular justice is rectificatory and it consists of the voluntary and involuntary. This sort of justice deals with transactions between people who are not equals and looks only at the harm or suffering caused to an individual. This is a sort of blind justice since it treats both parties as if they were equal regardless of their actual worth: "It makes no difference whether a good man has defrauded a bad man or a bad one a good one". Once again trying to describe justice as a mean, he says that "men require a judge to be a middle term or medium—indeed in some places judges are called mediators—, for they think that if they get the mean they will get what is just. Thus the just is a sort of mean, inasmuch as the judge is a medium between the litigants". To restore both parties to equality, a judge must take the amount that is greater than the equal that the offender possesses and give that part to the victim so that both have no more and no less than the equal. This rule should be applied to rectify both voluntary and involuntary transactions.

Finally, Aristotle turns to the idea that reciprocity ("an eye for an eye") is justice, an idea he associates with the Pythagoreans. The problem with this approach to justice, although it is normal in politics and law-making, is that it ignores the difference between different reasons for doing a crime. For example, it could have been done out of passion or ignorance, and this makes a critical difference when it comes to determining what is the just reaction. This in turn returns Aristotle to mention the fact that laws are not normally exactly the same as what is just: "Political Justice is of two kinds, one natural, the other conventional." In a famous statement, Aristotle makes a point that, like many points in Book 5, is thought to refer us to consideration of Plato's Republic. "Some people think that all rules of justice are merely conventional, because whereas a law of nature is immutable and has the same validity everywhere, as fire burns both here and in Persia, rules of justice are seen to vary." Aristotle insists that justice is both fixed in nature in a sense, but also variable in a specific way: "the rules of justice ordained not by nature but by man are not the same in all places, since forms of government are not the same, though in all places there is only one form of government that is natural, namely, the best form." He believed people can generally see which types of rules are conventional, and which by nature—and he felt that most important when trying to judge whether someone was just or unjust was determining whether someone did something voluntarily or not. Some people commit crimes by accident or due to vices other than greed or injustice.

Book VI: Intellectual virtue
Book VI of the Nicomachean Ethics is identical to Book V of the Eudemian Ethics. Earlier in both works, both the Nicomachean Ethics Book IV, and the equivalent book in the Eudemian Ethics (Book III), though different, ended by stating that the next step was to discuss justice. Indeed, in Book I Aristotle set out his justification for beginning with particulars and building up to the highest things. Character virtues (apart from justice perhaps) were already discussed in an approximate way, as like achieving a middle point between two extreme options, but this now raises the question of how we know and recognize the things we aim at or avoid. Recognizing the mean means recognizing the correct boundary-marker which defines the frontier of the mean. And so practical ethics, having a good character, requires knowledge.

Near the end of Book I Aristotle said that we may follow others in considering the soul to be divided into a part having reason and a part without it. Now he will discuss the other type: that of thought (dianoia).

The part of the soul with reason is divided into two parts:
One whereby we contemplate or observe the things with invariable causes
One whereby we contemplate the variable things—the part with which we deliberate concerning actions

Aristotle states that if recognition depends upon likeness and kinship between the things being recognized and the parts of the soul doing the recognizing, then the soul grows naturally into two parts, specialised in these two types of cause.

Aristotle enumerates five types of hexis (stable dispositions) that the soul can have, and which can disclose truth:
Art (Techne). This is rational, because it involves making things deliberately, in a way that can be explained. (Making things in a way that could not be explained would not be .) It concerns variable things, but specifically it concerns intermediate aims. A house is built not for its own sake, but to have a place to live, and so on.
Knowledge (Episteme). "We all assume that what we know is not capable of being otherwise." And "it escapes our notice when they are or not". "Also, all knowledge seems to be teachable, and what is known is learnable."
Practical Judgement (Phronesis). While truth in  would concern making something needed for some higher purpose,  judges things according to the aim of living well overall. Aristotle associates this virtue with the political art. Aristotle distinguishes skilled deliberation from knowledge, because we do not need to deliberate about things we already know. It is also distinct from being good at guessing, or being good at learning, because true consideration is always a type of inquiry and reasoning.
Wisdom. Because wisdom belongs to the wise, who are unusual, it can not be that which gets hold of the truth.
Intellect (Nous). Is the capacity we develop with experience, to grasp the sources of knowledge and truth, our important and fundamental assumptions. Unlike knowledge, it deals with unarticulated truths.

In the last chapters of this book (12 and 13) Aristotle compares the importance of practical wisdom and wisdom. Although Aristotle describes  as more serious than practical judgement, because it is concerned with higher things, he mentions the earlier philosophers, Anaxagoras and Thales, as examples proving that one can be wise, having both knowledge and intellect, and yet devoid of practical judgement. The dependency of  upon  is described as being like the dependency of health upon medical knowledge. Wisdom is aimed at for its own sake, like health, being a component of that most complete virtue that makes happiness.

Aristotle closes by arguing that in any case, when one considers the virtues in their highest form, they would all exist together.

Book VII. Impediments to virtue
This book is the last of three books that are identical in both the Nicomachean Ethics and the Eudemian Ethics. It is Book VI in the latter.

Aristotle names three things humans should avoid that have to do with character:
Evils or vices, the opposites of virtues. These have been discussed already in Book II because, like the virtues, vices are stable dispositions, "knowingly and deliberately chosen" (Sachs p. 119).
Incontinence, the opposite of self-restraint. Unlike true vices, these are weaknesses where someone passively follows an urge rather than a deliberate choice.
Being beast-like, or brutish, the opposite of something more than human, something heroic or god-like such as Homer attributes to Hector. (Aristotle notes that these terms beast-like and god-like are strictly speaking only for humans, because real beasts or gods would not have virtue or vice.)

Book VII. Chapters 1–10: Self-mastery

According to Aristotle,  and self-restraint, are not to "be conceived as identical with Virtue and Vice, nor yet as different in kind from them". Aristotle argues that a simple equation should not be made between the virtue of temperance, and self-restraint, because self-restraint might restrain good desires, or weak unremarkable ones. Furthermore, a truly temperate person would not even have bad desires to restrain.

Aristotle reviews various opinions held about self-mastery, most importantly one he associates with Socrates. According to Aristotle, Socrates argued that all unrestrained behavior must be a result of ignorance, whereas it is commonly thought that the unrestrained person does things that they know to be evil, putting aside their own calculations and knowledge under the influence of passion. Aristotle begins by suggesting Socrates must be wrong, but comes to conclude at the end of Chapter 3 that "what Socrates was looking for turns out to be the case". His way of accommodating Socrates relies on the distinction between knowledge that is activated or not, for example in someone drunk or enraged. People in such a state may sound like they have knowledge, like an actor or student reciting a lesson can.

Other types of failure to master oneself are  only in a qualified sense, for example  "in anger" or "in the pursuit of honor". These he discusses next, under tendencies that are neither vice nor , but more animal-like.

Aristotle makes a nature and nurture distinction between different causes of bestial behavior he says occurs "in some cases from natural disposition, and in others from habit, as with those who have been abused from childhood." He refers to these as animal-like and disease-like conditions. Aristotle says that "every sort of senselessness or cowardice or dissipation or harshness that goes to excess is either animal-like or disease-like".

For Aristotle, "unrestraint", is distinct from animal-like behavior because it is specific to humans and involves conscious rational thinking about what to do, even though the conclusions of this thinking are not put into practice. When someone behaves in a purely animal-like way, then for better or worse they are not acting based upon any conscious choice.

Returning to the question of anger or spiritedness then, Aristotle distinguishes it from desires because he says it listens to reason, but often hears wrong, like a hasty servant or a guard dog. He contrasts this with desire, which he says does not obey reason, although it is frequently responsible for the weaving of unjust plots. He also says that a bad temper is more natural and less blamable than desire for excessive unnecessary pleasure. And he claims that acts of hubris never result from anger, but always have a connection to pleasure seeking, whereas angry people act from pain, and often regret it.

So there are two ways that people lose mastery of their own actions and do not act according to their own deliberations. One is through excitability, where a person does not wait for reason but follows the imagination, often having not been prepared for events. The other, worse and less curable case, is that of a weak person who has thought things through, but fails to do as deliberated because they are carried in another direction by a passion. Such people do not even know they are wrong, and feel no regrets. These are even less curable.

Finally Aristotle addresses a few questions raised earlier, on the basis of what he has explained:
Not everyone who stands firm on the basis of a rational and even correct decision has self-mastery. Stubborn people are actually more like a person without self-mastery, because they are partly led by the pleasure coming from victory.
Not everyone who fails to stand firm on the basis of his best deliberations has a true lack of self-mastery. As an example he gives the case of Neoptolemus (in Sophocles' Philoctetes) refusing to lie despite being part of a plan he agreed with.
A person with practical judgment can not have . Instead it might sometimes seem so, because mere cleverness can sometimes recite words that might make them sound wise, like an actor or a drunk person reciting poetry. As discussed above, a person lacking self-mastery can have knowledge, but not an active knowledge that they are paying attention to.

Book VII. Chapters 11–14: Pleasure as something to avoid

Aristotle discusses pleasure in two separate parts of the Nicomachean Ethics (book 7 chapters 11-14 and book 10 chapters 1-5). Plato had discussed similar themes in several dialogues, including the Republic and the Philebus and Gorgias.

In chapter 11 Aristotle goes through some of the things said about pleasure and particularly why it might be bad. But in chapter 12 he says that none of these things show that pleasure is not good, nor even the best thing. First, what is good or bad need not be good or bad simply, but can be good or bad for a certain person at a certain time. Secondly, according to Aristotle's way of analyzing causation, a good or bad thing can either be an activity ("being at work", energeia), or else a stable disposition (hexis). The pleasures from being restored into a natural  are accidental and not natural, for example the temporary pleasure that can come from a bitter taste. Things that are pleasant by nature are activities that are pleasant in themselves and involve no pain or desire. The example Aristotle gives of this is contemplation. Thirdly, such pleasures are ways of being at work, ends themselves, not just a process of coming into being aimed at some higher end. Even if a temperate person avoids excesses of some pleasures, they still have pleasures.

Chapter 13 starts from pain, saying it is clearly bad, either in a simple sense or as an impediment to things. He argues that this makes it clear that pleasure is good. He rejects the argument of Speusippus that pleasure and pain are only different in degree because this would still not make pleasure, bad, nor stop it, or at least some pleasure, even from being the best thing. Aristotle focuses from this on to the idea that pleasure is unimpeded, and that while it would make a certain sense for happiness to be a being at work that is unimpeded in some way, being impeded can hardly be good. Aristotle appeals to popular opinion that pleasure of some type is what people aim at, and suggests that bodily pleasure, while it might be the most obvious type of pleasure, is not the only type of pleasure. He points out that if pleasure is not good then a happy person will not have a more pleasant life than another, and would have no reason to avoid pain.

Chapter 14 first points out that any level of pain is bad, while concerning pleasure it is only excessive bodily pleasures that are bad. Finally, he asks why people are so attracted to bodily pleasures. Apart from natural depravities and cases where a bodily pleasure comes from being restored to health Aristotle asserts a more complex metaphysical reason, which is that for humans change is sweet, but only because of some badness in us, which is that part of every human has a perishable nature, and "a nature that needs change [..] is not simple nor good". God, in contrast, "enjoys a single simple pleasure perpetually".

Books VIII and IX: Friendship and partnership

Book II Chapter 6 discussed a virtue like friendship. Aristotle now says that friendship (philia) itself is a virtue, or involves virtue. It is not only important for living well, as a means, but is also a noble or beautiful end in itself that receives praise in its own right, and being a good friend is sometimes thought to be linked to being a good person.

Aristotle says speculations (for example about whether love comes from attractions between like things) are not germane to this discussion, and he divides aims of friendships or love into three types—each giving feelings of good will that go in two directions:
 Utility or usefulness
 Pleasure
 The pursuit of good
Two are inferior to the other because of the motive: friendships of utility and pleasure do not regard friends as people, but for what they can give in return.

Friendships of utility are relationships formed without regard to the other person at all. With these friendships are classed family ties of hospitality with foreigners, types of friendships Aristotle associates with older people. Such friends are often not very interested in being together, and the relationships are easily broken off when they cease to be useful.

At the next level, friendships of pleasure are based on fleeting emotions and are associated with young people. However, while such friends do like to be together, such friendships also end easily whenever people no longer enjoy the shared activity, or can no longer participate in it together.

Friendships based upon what is good are the perfect form of friendship, where both friends enjoy each other's virtue. As long as both friends keep similarly virtuous characters, the relationship will endure and be pleasant and useful and good for both parties, since the motive behind it is care for the friend themselves, and not something else. Such relationships are rare, because good people are rare, and bad people do not take pleasure in each other.

Aristotle suggests that although the word friend is used in these different ways, it is perhaps best to say that friendships of pleasure and usefulness are only analogous to real friendships. It is sometimes possible that at least in the case of people who are friends for pleasure familiarity will lead to a better type of friendship, as the friends learn to admire each other's characters.

Book IX and the last sections of Book VIII turn to the question of how friends and partners generally should reward each other and treat each other, whether it be in money or honor or pleasure. This can sometimes be complex because parties may not be equals. Aristotle notes that the type of friendship most likely to be hurt by complaints of unfairness is that of utility and reminds that "the objects and the personal relationships with which friendship is concerned appear [...] to be the same as those which are the sphere of justice." And it is the transactions of friends by utility that sometimes require the use of written laws. Furthermore, all associations and friendships are part of the greater community, the polis, and different relationships can be compared to the different types of constitution, according to the same classification system Aristotle explains in his Politics (Monarchy, Tyranny, Aristocracy, Oligarchy, Timocracy, and Democracy).

Book X: Pleasure, happiness, and up-bringing

Book X. Chapters 1–5: The theory of pleasure

Pleasure is discussed throughout the whole Ethics, but is given a final more focused and theoretical treatment in Book X. Aristotle starts by questioning the rule of thumb accepted in the more approximate early sections, whereby people think pleasure should be avoided—if not because it is bad simply, then because people tend too much towards pleasure seeking. He argues that people's actions show that this is not really what they believe. He reviews some arguments of previous philosophers, including first Eudoxus and Plato, to argue that pleasure is clearly a good pursued for its own sake even if it is not The Good, or in other words that which all good things have in common.

In chapter 3 Aristotle applies to pleasure his theory of motion as an energeia as explained in his Physics and Metaphysics. In terms of this approach, pleasure is not a movement or  because unlike the movement of walking across a specific room, or of building a house, or a part of a house, it has no end point when we can say it is completed. It is more like seeing which is either happening in a complete way or not happening. "Each moment of pleasurable consciousness is a perfect whole." 

A sense perception like sight is in perfect activity when it is in its best conditions and directed at the best objects. And when any sense is in such perfect activity, then there is pleasure, and similarly thinking and contemplation have associated pleasures. But seeing, for example is a whole, as is the associated pleasure. Pleasure does not complete the seeing or thinking, but is an extra activity, just as a healthy person can have an extra good "bloom of well-being".

This raises the question of why pleasure does not last, but seem to fade as if we get tired. Aristotle proposes as a solution to this that pleasure is pursued because of desire to live. Life is an activity made up of many activities such as music, thinking and contemplation, and pleasure brings the above-mentioned extra completion to each of these, bringing fulfilment and making life worthy of choice. Aristotle says we can dismiss the question of whether we live for pleasure or choose pleasure for the sake of living, for the two activities seem incapable of being separated.

Different activities in life, the different sense perceptions, thinking, contemplating, bring different pleasures, and these pleasures make the activities grow, for example a flute player gets better at it as they also get more pleasure from it. But these pleasures and their associated activities also impede with each other just as a flute player cannot participate in an argument while playing. This raises the question of which pleasures are more to be pursued. Some pleasures are more beautiful and some are more base or corrupt. Aristotle ranks some of them as follows:

 thinking
 sight
 hearing and smell
 taste

Aristotle also argues that each type of animal has pleasures appropriate to it, and in the same way there can be differences between people in what pleasures are most suitable to them. Aristotle proposes that it would be most beautiful to say that the person of serious moral stature is the appropriate standard, with whatever things they enjoy being the things most pleasant.

Book X. Chapters 6–8: Happiness
Turning to happiness then, the aim of the whole Ethics; according to the original definition of Book I it is the activity or being-at-work chosen for its own sake by a morally serious and virtuous person. This raises the question of why play and bodily pleasures cannot be happiness, because for example tyrants sometimes choose such lifestyles. But Aristotle compares tyrants to children, and argues that play and relaxation are best seen not as ends in themselves, but as activities for the sake of more serious living. Any random person can enjoy bodily pleasures, including a slave, and no one would want to be a slave.

Aristotle says that if perfect happiness is activity in accordance with the highest virtue, then this highest virtue must be the virtue of the highest part, and Aristotle says this must be the intellect (nous) "or whatever else it be that is thought to rule and lead us by nature, and to have cognizance of what is noble and divine". This highest activity, Aristotle says, must be contemplation or speculative thinking. This is also the most sustainable, pleasant, self-sufficient activity; something aimed at for its own sake. (In contrast to politics and warfare it does not involve doing things we'd rather not do, but rather something we do at our leisure.) However, Aristotle says this aim is not strictly human, and that to achieve it means to live in accordance not with our mortal thoughts but with something immortal and divine which is within humans. According to Aristotle, contemplation is the only type of happy activity it would not be ridiculous to imagine the gods having. The intellect is indeed each person's true self, and this type of happiness would be the happiness most suited to humans, with both happiness and the intellect being things other animals do not have. Aristotle also claims that compared to other virtues, contemplation requires the least in terms of possessions and allows the most self-reliance, "though it is true that, being a man and living in the society of others, he chooses to engage in virtuous action, and so will need external goods to carry on his life as a human being".

Book X. Chapter 9: The need for education, habituation and good laws

Finally, Aristotle repeats that the discussion of the Ethics has not reached its aim if it has no effect in practice. Theories are not enough. However, the practice of virtue requires good education and habituation from an early age in the community. Young people otherwise do not ever get to experience the highest forms of pleasure and are distracted by the easiest ones. While parents often attempt to do this, it is critical that there are also good laws in the community. But concerning this need for good laws and education Aristotle says that there has always been a problem, which he is now seeking to address: unlike in the case of medical science, theoreticians of happiness and teachers of virtue such as sophists never have practical experience themselves, whereas good parents and lawmakers have never theorized and developed a scientific approach to analyzing what the best laws are. Furthermore, very few lawmakers, perhaps only the Spartans, have made education the focus of law making, as they should. Education needs to be more like medicine, with both practice and theory, and this requires a new approach to studying politics. Such study should, he says, even help in communities where the laws are not good and the parents need to try to create the right habits in young people themselves without the right help from lawmakers.

Aristotle closes the Nicomachean Ethics therefore by announcing a programme of study in politics, including the collecting of studies of different constitutions, and the results of this programme are generally assumed to be contained in the work that exists today and is known as the Politics.

Influence and Derivative Works
Domenico di Piacenza relies on chapter 3 as an authority in his 15th century treatise on dance principles (one of the earliest written documents of the formal principles of dance that eventually become classical ballet). For di Piacenza, who taught that the ideal smoothness of dance movement could only be attained by a balance of qualities, relied on Aristotelian philosophical concepts of movement, measure and memory to extol dance on moral grounds, as a virtue.

Editions

Greek text
 Aristotle, Ethica Nicomachea. Ed. Ingram Bywater. Oxford University Press, 1920. ISBN 9780198145110.

Translations

 (With commentaries and glossary. Reprint of 1975 edn.)
 (Translation, with Interpretive Essay, Notes, Glossary.)
 (Translation, with Introduction and Notes.)

 (Translation, with Introduction and Notes.)
. Re-issued 1980, revised by J. L. Ackrill and J. O. Urmson.

. Re-issued 1976, revised by Hugh Tredennick.

See also

Aristotelian ethics
Corpus Aristotelicum
Economics (Oeconomica)
Potentiality and actuality
Ethics
Eudaimonia
Eudemian Ethics (Ethica Eudemia)
Hexis
Intellectual virtue
Lesbian rule
Magna Moralia (Great Ethics)
Moral character
Nous
On Virtues and Vices (De Virtutibus et Vitiis Libellus)
Phronesis
Politics
Protrepticus
Summum bonum
Virtue
Virtue ethics

Footnotes

Further reading

External links

 
 W. D. Ross translation
 from The Internet Classics Archive (Massachusetts Institute of Technology)
 from nothingistic.org
 from McMaster (PDF)
 H Rackham translation plus Greek version (The Perseus Project)
 Lecture on Aristotle's Nicomachaean Ethics A very complete analysis of Nicomachean Ethics.
 Nicomachean Ethics Sparknote A study guide for Nicomachean Ethics.
 Nicomachean Ethics, trans. by Harris Rackham (HTML at Perseus) with Bekker numbers.
 John N. Hatzopoulos, 2009, "The boundaries of right and wrong – Learning and the human brain", ACSM Bulletin, February 2009, pp. 20–22. 
 
 Diglossa.org/Aristotle/Ethics: multi-language library Russian: Н. В. Брагинская, English: W. D. Ross
 PDFs of several (now) public domain translations and commentaries on the Nicomachean Ethics

Books about friendship
Ethics books
Works by Aristotle